Saint-Ex is a 1996 British television film, which was released as an episode of the BBC Two TV series Bookmark, after its premiere at the London Film Festival. The story documents the life of French author-aviator Antoine de Saint-Exupéry in the form of a "tone poem". The film was directed by Anand Tucker and stars Bruno Ganz, Miranda Richardson and Janet McTeer. The screenplay was by Frank Cottrell Boyce, while the writer's sons, Aidan and Joseph, portrayed the Saint-Exupéry brothers, François and Antoine, as children.

Plot
Antoine de Saint-Exupéry (Bruno Ganz), growing up in an aristocratic French family, chooses to become a pilot. To the dismay of his family, young Antoine leaves to take a job flying airmail overseas.

Antoine marries beautiful Consuelo (Miranda Richardson), and they set up house in Casablanca. The constant strain on their marriage from his dangerous flights results in Consuelo leaving and going to Paris. Antoine goes after her, they reconcile, but he refuses to give up flying even when he is almost killed when he crashes in an attempt to break the Paris-Saigon air record.

By the late 1930s, Antoine becomes a successful airmail pilot flying in Europe, Africa and South America. During this period, he became a writer, with his most famous work being The Little Prince.

At the outbreak of World War II, Antoine joins the French Air Force (Armée de l'Air), but after France is defeated, he joins the Free French Air Force in North Africa. In July 1944, while flying an F-5 Lightning on a reconnaissance mission over the Mediterranean, Antoine mysteriously disappears.

Cast

 Bruno Ganz as Antoine de Saint-Exupéry
 Miranda Richardson as Consuelo de Saint-Exupéry
 Janet McTeer as Genevieve de Ville-Franche
 Ken Stott as Prevost
 Katrin Cartlidge as Gabrielle de Saint-Exupéry
 Brid Brennan as Simone de Saint-Exupéry
 Eleanor Bron as Marie de Saint-Exupéry
 Karl Johnson as Didier Daurat
 Daniel Craig as Guillaumet
 Dominic Rowan as Aeropostal Clerk
 Anna Calder-Marshall as Moisy
 Joe Cottrell Boyce as Young Antoine
 Aidan Cottrell Boyce as Francois
 Nicholas Hewetson as French Pilot
 Alex Kingston as Chic Party Guest

Production
Saint-Ex was filmed and distributed in the United Kingdom. The film was director Anand Tucker's feature film debut, and combines elements of biography, documentary and dramatic re-creation. The use of period documentary interviews in black-and-white is interspersed with live action and optical effects generated on film in colour.

Reception
Saint-Ex was reviewed by Derek Elley for Variety: "Reach falls short of ambition in 'Saint-Ex,' an intriguing attempt to create a cinematic tone-poem to legendary French flyer-cum-novelist Antoine de Saint-Exupéry that only rarely gets both wheels off the ground. Despite some striking visuals and an evident desire to take a fresh look at the biopic genre, the movie remains strangely uninvolving for much of the time and isn't helped by a miscast Bruno Ganz as the titular aviator. Theatrical prospects look fog-bound."

References

Notes

Bibliography

 Allon, Yoram, Del Cullen and Hannah Patterson. Contemporary British and Irish Film Directors: A Wallflower Critical Guide (Wallflower Critical Guides). London: Wallflower, 2001. .

External links
 
 
 
 

1996 television films
1996 films
British television films
British aviation films
British biographical films
Biographical television films
Antoine de Saint-Exupéry
Films about shot-down aviators
Films with screenplays by Frank Cottrell-Boyce
Films directed by Anand Tucker
Biographical films about writers
1990s English-language films
1990s British films